"Open Mind" is the second solo single released by South Korean singer Wonho. It was released as the lead single and second single from his debut EP Love Synonym Pt.1: Right for Me on September 4, 2020.

Background and release 
The song alongside Wonho's EP was announced on August 9, as the first solo project of Wonho following his departure from Monsta X in October 2019. On August 30, a twenty second video showing a preview of the choreography was released as a teaser.

Wonho performed the song on his debut showcase on the same day as the song's release, hosted through V Live.

Composition and lyrics
It uses a foundation of Eighties-style warped bass and synth to tremendous effect, veering into the electronic music with the occasional distorted vocals and a 808 beat. Wonho's vocals on the song were described as hazy over the pre-chorus and that they lead to a groovy, funk-fuelled drop. The lyrics of the song are a bold invitation to a "one-night stand". The track also grooves with an  electro-funk current.

Music video
The music video for the song was released alongside the song.

Synopsis
The music video was described as choreography-heavy, with Wonho and his backup dancers performing sleek moves on a dance floor lit up in elegant combinations of reds, purples and blues. The video is interspersed with scenes of the singer getting ready for a night out. The singer then tosses a silver coin contemplatively in the air, stands in an elevator that’s climbing past hundreds of floors and drives a powerful car through a tunnel of streaming, neon lights.

Charts

Accolades

Listicles

Release history

See also
 List of K-pop songs on the Billboard charts

Notes

References

2020 songs
2020 singles